Ford France was a French professional cycling team that existed from 1965 to 1966. The team's main sponsor was Ford France, a subsidiary of the American automaker Ford Motor Company. The team had two different co-sponsors for both seasons, bicycle manufacturer Gitane and tire manufacturer Hutchinson SA, respectively.

References

External links

Cycling teams based in France
Defunct cycling teams based in France
1965 establishments in France
1966 disestablishments in France
Cycling teams established in 1965
Cycling teams disestablished in 1966